The 2008 Taça da Liga Final was the final match of the 2007–08 Taça da Liga, the 1st season of the Taça da Liga, a knockout cup competition organized by the Portuguese League for Professional Football (LPFP). The match was played on the 22 March 2008 at the Estádio do Algarve in Faro, and opposed two Primeira Liga sides Sporting CP and Vitória de Setúbal.

In Portugal, the final was televised live on RTP and Sport TV. Vitória de Setúbal defeated Sporting CP 3–2 on penalties, after both sides were unable to break the deadlock in normal time. As a result of Vitória de Setúbal winning the Taça da Liga, the Sadinos claimed over €500,000 in prize money.

Route to the final

Note: In all results below, the score of the finalist is given first (H: home; A: away).

Match

Details

References

2008
Taca da Liga
Vitória F.C. matches
Sporting CP matches
Association football penalty shoot-outs